Maa Shakti (previously known as Aarki) is the name of the world record garba, which has been organized every year by Mr. Jayesh Thakkar and his NGO Samvedan Charitable Trust which runs the garba festival in the city of Vadodara.

Overview
Jayesh Thakkar has organised this event under Sam Vedan Charitable Trust. Nitin Sandesara formerly organised it under the name Maa Aarki. Navratri, who strongly believed in the traditional form of Garba, introduced it.  Mr. Nitin Sandesara who started this theme, ceased organising the event and for the last 10 years, it has been known as "Maa Shakti/RISHABH Group", but its popularity has not decreased. Owing to the organising committee, Maa Shakti/RISHABH Group of Vadodara has taken a global face. Crores of rupees are now spent on the event of navratri in Gujarat.  Under Nitin sandesaras arkee garb there was not even one advertisement on the grounds as he believed that it is a place of worship and there are no advertisements in a temple.

The organisers of the event ensure the traditional aspect of the event. The organisers set rules such as the dancers only being allowed on the ground wearing traditional costumes and aarti of the goddess Amba. The garbas are performed in large circles around the main stage. The number of circles varies between 15–20. The singers sing traditional and new compositions in Gujarati.

Record
Maa Shakti holds a record in the Limca Book of Records of holding the largest number of dancers in the ground. The number of dancers present in the ground (when the record was set) was about 38,850.Total
5 lakhs peoples at that time on garba ground.

Dance organizations
Vadodara
Cultural organisations based in India
Organisations based in Gujarat
1998 establishments in Gujarat
Recurring events established in 1998